Talekstan (also Romanized as Taleḵstān) is a village in Sepiddasht Rural District, Papi District, Khorramabad County, Lorestan Province, Iran. At the 2006 census, its population was 90, in 17 families.

References 

Towns and villages in Khorramabad County